Barleria popovii is a species of plant in the family Acanthaceae. It is endemic to Yemen.  Its natural habitat is subtropical or tropical dry forests. It is threatened by habitat loss.

References

Endemic flora of Socotra
popovii
Endangered plants
Taxonomy articles created by Polbot